Wamba crispulus is a species of cobweb spider in the family Theridiidae. It is found in a range from Canada to Brazil and the Caribbean.

References

Theridiidae
Articles created by Qbugbot
Spiders described in 1895
Spiders of North America
Spiders of South America